Tourments , is a French drama film from 1954, directed by Jacques Daniel-Norman, written by Jacques Daniel-Norman, starring Paul Azaïs and Louis de Funès.

Plot
Jean-Jacques and Anne-Marie have adopted little Jean-Claude. The small family lives happily until the child's real mother decides she wants the boy back. She assigns a ruthless private detective to kidnap Jean-Claude.

Cast 
 Paul Azaïs : father Bizule, security guard of a construction site
 Louis de Funès : Eddy Gorlier, private detective
 Tino Rossi : Jean-Jacques Duflot, called: Tony Caylor, a once famous singer
 Blanchette Brunoy : Anne-Marie Duflot, wife of Jean-Jacques
 Jacqueline Porel : Simone Rebeira, Jean-Claude's real mother
 Charles Deschamps : Monsieur de Vandière, Anne-Marie's father
 Claudy Chapeland : Jean-Claude Duflot, the little boy
 Raymond Cordy : Jo Braitone
 Andrée Servilange : Madame of Prinjelles, head of the orphanage
 Renée Corciade : Madame Prestat
 Jean Berton : Victor, the majordomo
 Jackie Sardou

References

External links 
 
 Tourments (1954) at the Films de France

1954 films
French drama films
1950s French-language films
French black-and-white films
Films directed by Jacques Daniel-Norman
1954 drama films
1950s French films